Solaris Trollino is a series of low-floor trolleybuses designed for public transport, produced since 1999 by the Polish company Solaris Bus & Coach. The power regulation electronics and traction motors are delivered by other companies, such as Škoda Electric, Kiepe Electric,  or Cegelec.

The first prototype was produced in 2001 and ran the first races on the Gdynia road network.

Description and models 
There are four different length variants (the number indicates length in meters):
Solaris Trollino 12 (also sold as Škoda 26Tr Solaris) 
Solaris Trollino 15 (also sold as Škoda 28Tr Solaris) - no longer in production
Solaris Trollino 18 (articulated, also sold as Škoda 27Tr Solaris)
Solaris Trollino 24 (bi-articulated, also sold as Škoda-Solaris 24M)

The trolleybuses can be fully dependent on wires, or they can be equipped with supercapacitors, batteries, fuel cells or diesel generators.

References

Solaris Bus & Coach
Low-floor buses
Hybrid electric buses
Buses of Poland
Trolleybuses